Mohamed Lamine Sissoko (born 22 January 1985) is a former professional footballer who played as a defensive midfielder.

Born in France, he could have elected to play for France internationally, but chose instead to play for the national side of his ancestral country, Mali.

Club career

Auxerre
Sissoko played as a second striker in the youth system of French club AJ Auxerre.

Valencia
In 2003 Sissoko made a free transfer to Spanish club Valencia CF, managed by Rafael Benítez, where he was deployed in midfield. Valencia won the 2003–04 La Liga title and in the same year became UEFA Cup champions, during which Sissoko played nine matches. The following year, Benítez left to manage Liverpool and was replaced by Claudio Ranieri.

Liverpool

Sissoko moved from Valencia to Liverpool for £5.6 million in the summer of 2005. His first appearance was against Kaunas on 26 July 2005 in the UEFA Champions League qualifiers. In February 2006, he suffered serious eye injury after collision with Benfica's midfielder Beto.

Sissoko was part of the FA Cup winning side in 2006 and played an integral role for the team. In the summer of 2007, Sissoko rejected offers from Barcelona, CSKA Moscow and Juventus to stay on Merseyside. His only goal for Liverpool came on 25 August 2007, a low shot from twenty yards out against Sunderland in a 2–0 away win.

Juventus
In January 2008 Sissoko transferred to Italian club Juventus, where he would team up with former coach Claudio Ranieri, for a fee of €11 million. He made his first appearance for the club in February 2008, coming in as a 67th minute substitution for Tiago in a Serie A fixture versus Cagliari Calcio. Sissoko scored his first goal for Juventus on 2 March 2008, the equaliser against Fiorentina. During the first half of the 2008–09 season, he regularly featured in the starting line-up, forming a partnership with youngster Claudio Marchisio as the centre midfield pair in Claudio Ranieri's 4–4–2 formation. His season ended early after he broke his foot in March 2009 ruling him out for the rest of that season and into the start of the 2009–10 season.

Sissoko's injury problems continued throughout the rest of the 2009–10 season and into 2010–11 season, as he suffered thigh strains, a leg strain, Achilles tendon inflammation, and finally season-ending knee surgery in March 2011.

Paris Saint-Germain
On 28 July 2011, Sissoko moved to Ligue 1 side Paris Saint-Germain for a transfer fee of €7 million, plus €1 million if they qualified for the Group Stage of the UEFA Champions League before September 2013. Sissoko scored his first goal for PSG in November, when he headed in a cross from Nenê, in a 1–1 draw against Bordeaux at the Stade Chaban Delmas. In April 2012 he captained the squad against rivals Olympique de Marseille in Le Classique, but was sent off in the 86th minute for two bookable offences in a game that finished 2–1 to the Parisian club.

On 30 January 2013, Sissoko joined Fiorentina on loan.
On 3 September 2013 Sissoko left PSG by mutual consent.

Later years
On 30 January 2014, Sissoko joined La Liga side Levante on a six-month deal after spending nearly five months without a club. On 25 June 2015, he was transferred to Chinese Super League side Shanghai Shenhua, and was released on 21 February 2016.

On 1 October 2016, he joined Indian Super League franchise FC Pune City as a marquee player. On 17 February 2017, he joined Italian club Ternana Calcio on a six-month contract, but terminated his contract just 25 days later.
 
On 13 April 2017, he joined Indonesian club side Mitra Kukar on a one-year contract. On 2 December 2017, Sissoko switched to Mexican club Atlético San Luis.

On 4 July 2018. Sissoko moved to Hong Kong Premier League club Kitchee on a one-year deal. Less than four months later, he terminated his contract in order to care for his father in France.

On 16 January 2019, he signed a six-month contract with FC Sochaux-Montbéliard.

In January 2020, Sissoko announced his retirement as a player.

International career
Born in Mont-Saint-Aignan, France, Sissoko was eligible to play for the France national team but opted to play international football for his ancestral country Mali. He obtained his first international call-up to the Mali national team in 2004, and appeared for his country in almost all African Cup of Nations qualifiers and tournaments since then. He also featured in FIFA World Cup qualifiers for both 2006 and 2010. Sissoko made 34 official appearances for Mali, and scored 2 goals. With Mali, he finished fourth in the 2004 African Cup of Nations, and third in the 2013 African Cup of Nations.

Style of play
A large, quick, combative, and physically strong defensive midfielder, Sissoko excels as a ball winner, a role which allows him to support his more offensive midfield teammates defensively by laying off the ball to them after winning back possession. Due to his tenacious tackling, stamina, work-rate, and tactical intelligence, he has been compared to former French midfielder Patrick Vieira, also earning the nickname "La Piovra" (the octopus) during his time with Juventus, due to his long limbs and energetic style of play. In addition to his ball-winning abilities, and his physical and athletic attributes, he is also known for his powerful striking ability from distance.

Personal life
Sissoko is the nephew of former African Footballer of the Year Salif Keïta, who, like Sissoko, played for Mali and Valencia CF. Salif Keita is also the uncle of former FC Barcelona midfielder Seydou Keita. Both Sissoko and Seydou Keita play similar roles as hard-tackling defensive midfielders. Sissoko is sometimes referred to as "the Black Ninja" for his tenacious tackling and work rate. He is the elder brother of Abdou Sissoko. He is the cousin of the footballer Oumar Sissoko.

Sissoko has said "I am proud of being a Muslim and I follow Ramadan even during the football tournament," on the Dubai-based Arab TV network, Al Arabiya.

Career statistics

Club

International

Scores and results list Mali's goal tally first, score column indicates score after each Sissoko goal.

Honours
Valencia
La Liga: 2003–04
UEFA Cup: 2003–04
UEFA Super Cup: 2004

Liverpool
FIFA Club World Championship runner-up: 2005
FA Cup: 2005–06
FA Community Shield: 2006
UEFA Super Cup: 2005

Paris Saint-Germain
Ligue 1: 2012–13

Mali
Africa Cup of Nations bronze: 2013

Individual
Community Shield Man of the Match: 2006

References

External links

 
 Profile at BBC Sport 
 LFChistory.net player profile
 

1985 births
Living people
Sportspeople from Seine-Maritime
Malian footballers
French footballers
French Muslims
Malian expatriate footballers
Mali international footballers
AJ Auxerre players
Valencia CF players
UEFA Cup winning players
Liverpool F.C. players
Juventus F.C. players
Paris Saint-Germain F.C. players
ACF Fiorentina players
Levante UD footballers
Shanghai Shenhua F.C. players
FC Sochaux-Montbéliard players
La Liga players
Premier League players
Serie A players
Serie B players
Ligue 1 players
Ligue 2 players
Chinese Super League players
Expatriate footballers in Spain
Expatriate footballers in England
Expatriate footballers in Italy
Expatriate footballers in China
French expatriate sportspeople in Spain
French expatriate sportspeople in England
French expatriate sportspeople in Italy
French expatriate sportspeople in China
Association football midfielders
Footballers at the 2004 Summer Olympics
Olympic footballers of Mali
2004 African Cup of Nations players
2008 Africa Cup of Nations players
People from Mont-Saint-Aignan
2010 Africa Cup of Nations players
French people of Malian descent
2013 Africa Cup of Nations players
Kitchee SC players
French expatriates in Hong Kong
Indian Super League players
FA Cup Final players
Footballers from Normandy